Carryl is a surname and given name. Notable people with the name are as follows:

Surname
Charles E. Carryl (1841–1920), American businessman and author
June Carryl (born 1967), American actress and playwright
Guy Wetmore Carryl (1873–1904), American author, poet, and humorist
Mary Carryl (Unknown – 1809), Irish servant

Given name
Carryl Thomas (born 17 May 1977) is an English actress

See also
 Caral
 Carel
 Carell
 Caril
 Carol (disambiguation)
 Caroll
 Caryl